Nigade is a small village in Ratnagiri district, Maharashtra state in Western India. The 2011 Census of India recorded a total of 752 residents in the village. Nigade is 577.34 hectares in size.

References

Further reading
 

Villages in Ratnagiri district